Steven Olson Tannen (born July 23, 1948) is an American former college and professional football player who was a defensive back in the National Football League (NFL) for five seasons during the early 1970s. Tannen played college football for the University of Florida, and was recognized as an All-American.  He was a first-round pick in the 1970 NFL Draft, and played his entire professional career for the New York Jets of the NFL.

Early years 
Tannen is Jewish, was born in Miami, Florida, and attended Southwest Miami High School. He was an outstanding track and field athlete in the Florida Relays as a senior in high school, competing in the high hurdles, pole vault, high jump and the 440 relay, as well as starring in high school football for the Southwest Miami Eagles. In 2007, 41 years after he graduated from high school, the Florida High School Athletic Association (FHSAA) recognized Tannen as one of the "100 Greatest Players of the First 100 Years" of Florida high school football.

College career 
Tannen accepted an athletic scholarship to attend the University of Florida in Gainesville, Florida, where he played defensive back for coach Ray Graves' Florida Gators football team from 1967 to 1969. He developed a reputation for tough play and being brash and cocky. Tannen was a first-team All-Southeastern Conference (SEC) selection in 1968, a first-team All-American in 1969, and the recipient of the Gators' Fergie Ferguson Award recognizing the "senior football player who displays outstanding leadership, character and courage." Memorably, Tannen blocked a punt in the 1969 Gator Bowl, which was returned for a touchdown and provided the Gators' margin of victory in their 14–13 upset win over the Tennessee Volunteers, and helped the Gators achieve their then best-ever record of 9–1–1. A versatile athlete, Tannen finished his three-season college career with 11 interceptions, and led the team in punt return yardage as a senior.

Tannen graduated from Florida with a bachelor's degree in business administration in 1972, and was later inducted into the University of Florida Athletic Hall of Fame as a "Gator Great." In 2006, the sportswriters of The Gainesville Sun chose him as No. 15 among the 100 greatest players from the first 100 years of Florida Gators football.

Professional career 
Shoulder injuries slowed him, but he managed to play in 13 of the games and led the team in interceptions with seven during the  season. In  he managed to start three games at free safety and spent the bulk of the season as backup man at either safety or at cornerback since he had experience at all positions. During his five-year NFL career, Tannen played in 64 games and had 12 interceptions with 204 return yards. He was also a standout special teamer, and blocked two field goals and a punt.

After retiring from the NFL in 1974, Tannen lived in California doing a variety jobs including acting, and then relocated to Gainesville, Florida in 2012.

See also 

 1969 College Football All-America Team
 Florida Gators football, 1960–69
 List of Florida Gators in the NFL Draft
 List of New York Jets first-round draft picks
 List of New York Jets players
 List of University of Florida alumni
 List of University of Florida Athletic Hall of Fame members
 List of select Jewish football players

References

Bibliography 
 Carlson, Norm, University of Florida Football Vault: The History of the Florida Gators, Whitman Publishing, LLC, Atlanta, Georgia (2007). .
 Golenbock, Peter, Go Gators!  An Oral History of Florida's Pursuit of Gridiron Glory, Legends Publishing, LLC, St. Petersburg, Florida (2002). .
 Hairston, Jack, Tales from the Gator Swamp: A Collection of the Greatest Gator Stories Ever Told, Sports Publishing, LLC, Champaign, Illinois (2002). .
 McCarthy, Kevin M., Fightin' Gators: A History of University of Florida Football, Arcadia Publishing, Mount Pleasant, South Carolina (2000).  .
 McEwen, Tom, The Gators: A Story of Florida Football, The Strode Publishers, Huntsville, Alabama (1974). .
 Nash, Noel, ed., The Gainesville Sun Presents The Greatest Moments in Florida Gators Football, Sports Publishing, Inc., Champaign, Illinois (1998). .

1948 births
21st-century American Jews
All-American college football players
American football cornerbacks
American football safeties
Florida Gators football players
Jewish American sportspeople
Living people
New York Jets players
Players of American football from Miami
Southwest Miami Senior High School alumni